Antonin Jarrety (2 August 1898 – 7 November 1977) was a French hurdler. He competed in the men's 400 metres hurdles at the 1920 Summer Olympics.

References

External links
 

1898 births
1977 deaths
Athletes (track and field) at the 1920 Summer Olympics
French male hurdlers
Olympic athletes of France
Place of birth missing
19th-century French people
20th-century French people